The Czech Indoor Gala is an annual indoor track and field competition which takes place in January or February at the Ostravar Aréna in Ostrava, Czech Republic. The meeting was first held in 2009 in Prague before it moved after unsteady intervals to Jablonec nad Nisou in 2016 and Ostrava in 2017. Currently it is a World Athletics Indoor Tour Silver meeting.

Meeting records

Men

Women

References

External links
 Czech Indoor Gala web site

Athletics competitions in the Czech Republic
Annual indoor track and field meetings
Recurring sporting events established in 2016